Frittata is an egg-based Italian dish similar to an omelette or crustless quiche or scrambled eggs, enriched with additional ingredients such as meats, cheeses, or vegetables. The word frittata is Italian and roughly translates to "fried".

History 
The Italian word frittata derives from friggere and roughly means "fried". This was originally a general term for cooking eggs in a skillet, anywhere on the spectrum from fried egg, through conventional omelette, to an Italian version of the Spanish omelette, made with fried potato. Outside Italy, frittata was seen as equivalent to "omelette" until at least the mid-1950s.

Frittata has come to be a term for a distinct variation that Delia Smith describes as "Italy's version of an open-face omelette". When used in this sense, there are four key differences from a conventional omelette:

 While there may or may not be additional ingredients, such as cubed potato, such ingredients are combined with the beaten egg mixture while the eggs are still raw rather than being laid over the mostly cooked egg mixture before it is folded, as in an omelette.
 Eggs may be beaten vigorously, to incorporate more air than traditional savory omelettes, to allow a deeper filling and a fluffier result.
 The mixture is cooked over a very low heat, more slowly than an omelette, for at least five minutes, typically 15, until the underside is set but the top is still runny.
 The partly cooked frittata is not folded to enclose its contents, like an omelette, but is instead either turned over in full, or grilled briefly under an intense salamander to set the top layer, or baked for around five minutes.

See also 

  (a similar Arab egg dish)
  (a similar Persian egg dish)
 
 
  
  (a similar Spanish dish)
  (a similar Tunisian egg dish)
 Zucchini slice, a frittata-like dish popular in Australia

References

External links 

Egg dishes
Omelettes
Italian cuisine